Life form (also spelled life-form or lifeform) is an entity that is living, such as plants (flora) and animals (fauna). It is estimated that more than 99% of all species that ever existed on Earth, amounting to over five billion species, are extinct.

Earth is the only celestial body known to harbor life forms. No form of extraterrestrial life has been discovered yet.

Archaea
 Archaea – a domain of single-celled microorganisms, morphologically similar to bacteria, but they possess genes and several metabolic pathways that are more closely related to those of eukaryotes, notably the enzymes involved in transcription and translation. Many archaea are extremophiles, which means living in harsh environments, such as hot springs and salt lakes, but they have since been found in a broad range of habitats.
 Thermoproteota – a phylum of the Archaea kingdom. Initially
 Thermoprotei
 Sulfolobales – grow in terrestrial volcanic hot springs with optimum growth occurring
 Euryarchaeota – In the taxonomy of microorganisms
 Haloarchaea
 Halobacteriales – in taxonomy, the Halobacteriales are an order of the Halobacteria, found in water saturated or nearly saturated with    salt.
 Methanobacteria
 Methanobacteriales – information including symptoms, causes, diseases, symptoms, treatments, and other medical and health issues.
 Methanococci
 Methanococcales aka Methanocaldococcus jannaschii – thermophilic methanogenic archaea, meaning that it thrives at high temperatures and produces methane
 Methanomicrobia
 Methanosarcinales – In taxonomy, the Methanosarcinales are an order of the Methanomicrobia
 Methanopyri
 Methanopyrales – In taxonomy, the Methanopyrales are an order of the methanopyri.
 Thermococci
 Thermococcales
 Thermoplasmata
 Thermoplasmatales –  An order of aerobic, thermophilic archaea, in the kingdom
 Halophiles – organisms that thrive in high salt concentrations
 Korarchaeota
 Korarchaeum cryptofilum – These archaea have only been found in high temperature hydrothermal environments, particularly hot springs
 Lokiarchaeota
 Methanogens
 Nanoarchaeota
 Nanoarchaeum equitans – This organism was discovered in 2002 and lives inside another archaea.
 Psychrophiles – (sigh-crow-files)
 Nitrososphaerota –  a phylum of the Archaea proposed in 2008 after the genome of Cenarchaeum symbiosum
 thermophilic – (a thermophile is an organism)

Bacteria
 Bacteria
Gram positive no outer membrane
Actinomycetota (high-G+C)
Bacillota (low-G+C)
Mycoplasmatota (no wall)
Gram negative  outer membrane present
Aquificota
Deinococcota
Fibrobacterota/Chlorobiota/Bacteroidota (FCB group)
Frateuria aurantia (a species of Proteobacteria)
Fusobacteriota
Gemmatimonadota
Nitrospirota
Planctomycetota/Verrucomicrobiota/Chlamydiota (PVC group)
Pseudomonadota/Myxococcota/Bdellovibrionota/Campylobacterota
Spirochaetota
Synergistota
Unknown / ungrouped
Acidobacteriota
Chloroflexota
Chrysiogenota
Cyanobacteria
Deferribacterota
Dictyoglomota
Thermodesulfobacteriota
Thermotogota

Eukaryote
 Eukaryote – organisms whose cells contain complex structures enclosed within membranes.
Unikonta
Opisthokonta
Animal – multicellular eukaryotic organisms that form the biological kingdom Animalia. With few exceptions, animals consume organic material, breathe oxygen, are able to move, reproduce sexually, and grow from a hollow sphere of cells, the blastula, during embryonic development.
 Subkingdom Parazoa
 Porifera
 Placozoa
 Subkingdom Eumetazoa
 Radiata (unranked)
 Ctenophora
 Cnidaria
 Bilateria (unranked)
 Orthonectida
 Rhombozoa
 Acoelomorpha
 Chaetognatha
 Superphylum Deuterostomia
 Chordata
 Hemichordata
 Echinodermata
 Xenoturbellida
 Vetulicolia †
 Protostomia (unranked)
 Superphylum Ecdysozoa
 Kinorhyncha
 Loricifera
 Priapulida
 Nematoda
 Nematomorpha
 Lobopodia
 Onychophora
 Tardigrada
 Arthropoda
 Superphylum Platyzoa
 Platyhelminthes
 Gastrotricha
 Rotifera
 Acanthocephala
 Gnathostomulida
 Micrognathozoa
 Cycliophora
 Superphylum Lophotrochozoa
 Sipuncula
 Hyolitha †
 Nemertea
 Phoronida
 Bryozoa
 Entoprocta
 Brachiopoda
 Mollusca
 Annelida
 Echiura
 Mesomycetozoa
Fungi – any member of the group of eukaryotic organisms that includes unicellular microorganisms such as yeasts and molds, as well as multicellular fungi that produce familiar fruiting forms known as mushrooms.
Blastocladiomycota
 Chytridiomycota
 Glomeromycota
 Microsporidia
 Neocallimastigomycota
Dikarya (inc. Deuteromycota)
 Ascomycota
 Pezizomycotina
 Saccharomycotina
 Taphrinomycotina
 Basidiomycota
 Agaricomycotina
 Pucciniomycotina
 Ustilaginomycotina
Subphyla incertae sedis
 Entomophthoromycotina
 Kickxellomycotina
 Mucoromycotina
 Zoopagomycotina
 Amoebozoa
Conosa
Mycetozoa (slime-molds)
Archamoebae
Lobosa
Protamoebae
 Bikonta
 Apusozoa
 Excavata
 Archaeplastida (plants, broadly defined)
 Glaucophyta – glaucophytes
 Rhodophyceae – red algae
 Chloroplastida
 Chlorophyta – green algae (part)
 Ulvophyceae
 Trebouxiophyceae
 Chlorophyceae
 Chlorodendrales – green algae (part)
 Prasinophytae – green algae (part)
 Mesostigma
 Charophyta sensu lato – green algae (part) and land plants
 Streptophytina – stoneworts and land plants
 Charales – stoneworts
 Plantae – land plants (embryophytes)
 SAR supergroup
 Alveolata
 Heterokonta
 Rhizaria

See also

 Outline of biology
 Earliest known life forms
 Extraterrestrial life
 Hypothetical types of biochemistry
 Life
 Marine life
 Organism

References

External links
 Life (Systema Naturae 2000)
 Vitae (BioLib)
 Biota (Taxonomicon)
 Wikispecies – a free directory of life
 MicrobeWiki, extensive wiki about bacteria and viruses

Tree of life
Outlines of biology
Wikipedia outlines